Callaway Fork is a stream in the U.S. state of Missouri. It is a tributary of Femme Osage Creek.

Callaway Fork has the name of Flanders Callaway, a pioneer settler.

See also
List of rivers of Missouri

References

Rivers of St. Charles County, Missouri
Rivers of Warren County, Missouri
Rivers of Missouri